CarDomain.com was an online community site for car enthusiasts. Users could create profiles of their cars including pictures and write-ups, view the work of others, talk to the other users and car enthusiasts, and create social network profiles.

History
CarDomain Network was founded in 1998 by Alex Algard and Simon Han and is headquartered in Seattle, Washington.

The company started as SoundDomain.com, which featured a mobile electronics forum and community functionality allowing users to show off their car stereo installations. As the site matured, additional features were added and, eventually, the vehicle profiles were rebranded as CarDomain. Recently, CarDomain has added video upload and user-run groups.

"At the end of 2004, the company had revenue of $13.3 million, and now has 70 employees and 1.5 million registered users". 

"Seattle startup CarDomain, a social-networking site for auto enthusiasts, cut 16 jobs (about half its staff) on November 18, 2008. “Although we are growing overall traffic and member engagement year-on-year, the economy and the automotive industry have taken a significant turn for the worse, leading to very pessimistic industry projections of advertising budgets and a protracted recovery period,” said CEO Rajan Krishnamurty, in a statement to TechFlash."

On April 8, 2009 CarDomain acquired fellow automotive social-networking site StreetFire, at that time, one of the largest user-generated content sites for automotive videos. CEO of StreetFire, Glenn Rogers, became CEO of the combined company.

In 2012 CarDomain was sold to Source Interlink Media, a company that owns a number of other car-oriented publications. (Source Interlink was subsequently renamed TEN: The Enthusiast Network, then Motor Trend Group.)

References

External links
CarDomain.com homepage
Where the Car Nuts Chitchat, Share Their Photos and Blog - New York Times Article
CarDomain.com appears ready to shift into overdrive - Puget Sound Business Journal article
Things I Can't Live Without: Alex Algard - Inc.com

Automotive websites
Motor Trend Group